Ingrid Maria Wetterstrand (born 2 October 1973) is a Swedish politician. She was one of the spokespersons of the Green Party alongside Peter Eriksson between 2002 and 2011. Between 2001 and 2011 she was a member of the Riksdag.

Wetterstrand has a master's degree in biology from the University of Gothenburg.

Wetterstrand was married to Ville Niinistö, a Finnish politician representing the Green League, between 3 July 2004 and 
7 June 2012. They have two children: a son, Elias, who was born in November 2004, and a daughter, Linnea, born 2007.

References

http://www.dn.se/valet-2014/maria-wetterstrand-gor-comeback-i-politiken/

External links
Maria Wetterstrand, blog
Maria Wetterstrand at the Riksdag website

1973 births
Living people
People from Eskilstuna
Members of the Riksdag from the Green Party
Leaders of political parties in Sweden
Swedish bloggers
Swedish feminists
Women members of the Riksdag
University of Gothenburg alumni
Swedish women bloggers
Members of the Riksdag 1998–2002
Members of the Riksdag 2002–2006
Members of the Riksdag 2006–2010
Members of the Riksdag 2010–2014
20th-century Swedish women politicians
21st-century Swedish women politicians
20th-century Swedish women